Leoben is a Styrian city in central Austria, located on the Mur river. With a population of about 25,000 it is a local industrial centre and hosts the University of Leoben, which specialises in mining. The Peace of Leoben, an armistice between Austria and France preliminary to the Treaty of Campo Formio, was signed in Leoben in 1797.

The Justice Centre Leoben is a prison designed by architect Josef Hohensinn, which was completed in 2005.

Name
Leoben was attested in historical sources as Liupina in AD 904. The name is of Slavic origin, meaning 'beloved', and is derived from the root ljub- 'love'.

Past and present 

Leoben is known as the “Gateway to the Styrian Iron Road”. The 13th-century Main Square features the Hackl House with its baroque façade in red and white. The City Parish Church, St. Francis Xavier, built in 1660, comprises a 17th-century interior and is considered one of the most significant Jesuit churches in Austria. Also of note is the Art Nouveau Lutheran church which is at the upper end of the Franz-Josef-Strasse.

The oldest convent for women in Styria is Göss Abbey. Founded in 1020 A.D., it was run by the Benedictine nuns until it was dissolved in 1782 and made the see of short-lived Diocese of Leoben. The early Romanesque crypt is of note as is the 'Gösser Ornat,' which can be seen in Vienna (Museum for Applied Arts). Next to the convent is the Gösser brewery, which includes a brewery museum.

Current cultural events include classical concerts in the Congress Leoben, productions of the Summer Philharmonic in July and performances of local and guest productions in the oldest operating theatre in Austria.

Tradition & avantgarde 
Leoben was shaped for centuries by the trade in iron and the research in raw materials carried out at the University of Leoben, which was founded in 1840. Mining traditions still play an important part in city life. Examples are the Miners' Parade, the St. Barbara Celebration or the Ledersprung ("Leather Jump"). The Gösser Kirtag, a street fair, takes place on the Thursday after the first Sunday in October and attracts tens of thousands of visitors to Leoben.

Other components of the vigorous cultural life of the "Mining City" include classical concerts in the Congress Leoben, productions of the Summer Philharmonics in July and performances of locally created and guest productions in the oldest still-running theatre in Austria.

Notable people 

 Lisa Eckhart (born 1992), Austrian comedian
 Tracey Gilmore, Australian politician
 , bishop
 Roland Linz, football player
 Wilfried Morawetz, botanist
 Chris Raaber "Bambikiller", professional wrestler
 Walter Schachner (aka "Schoko"), football trainer
 Christoph Strasser, ultra cyclist
 Martin Weinek (born 1964), actor

References

External links 
 
 
 University of Leoben
 Pictures of Leoben and information in English language

 
Cities and towns in Leoben District